Moussa El-Hariri (born 1 October 1966) is a Syrian long-distance runner. He competed in the men's marathon at the 1992 Summer Olympics.

References

1966 births
Living people
Athletes (track and field) at the 1992 Summer Olympics
Syrian male long-distance runners
Syrian male marathon runners
Olympic athletes of Syria
Place of birth missing (living people)
20th-century Syrian people